Fábio Luís Santos de Almeida, known as Fábio Luís (born 22 August 1983) is a former Brazilian football player.

Club career
He made his Primeira Liga debut for Académica de Coimbra on 26 September 2011 in a game against Feirense.

Honours
Académica de Coimbra
Taça de Portugal: 2011–12

References

External links
 

1983 births
Footballers from Porto Alegre
Living people
Brazilian footballers
Ipatinga Futebol Clube players
Associação Desportiva São Caetano players
Esporte Clube Santo André players
Avaí FC players
Paraná Clube players
Guaratinguetá Futebol players
Clube Atlético Bragantino players
Ulsan Hyundai FC players
K League 1 players
Brazilian expatriate footballers
Expatriate footballers in South Korea
Porto Alegre Futebol Clube players
Associação Académica de Coimbra – O.A.F. players
Expatriate footballers in Portugal
Primeira Liga players
São Carlos Futebol Clube players
Treze Futebol Clube players
Association football forwards